is a Japanese manga written and illustrated by Koge-Donbo about a seventh grade girl named Karin who finds out that she can transform into a goddess. The series began as a manga first serialized in January 2003. Kamichama Karin was serialized in the Japanese shōjo manga magazine Nakayoshi and published by Kodansha. While the first manga series ended at seven bound volumes, a second titled Kamichama Karin Chu (Little goddess Karin kiss) began serialization in the same magazine in July 2006, and as of April 2008, the series ended with seven bound volumes being released.

Kamichama Karin has been licensed in North America by Tokyopop. Del Rey Manga published Kamichama Karin Chu between June 24, 2008 and January 26, 2010. An anime series based on the original manga was produced by TV Tokyo, NAS, and Pony Canyon, animated by Satelight, and directed by Takashi Anno. It aired on TV Tokyo from April to September 2007.

Plot
Karin Hanazono is an ordinary 13-year-old girl who becomes depressed after the death of her parents and her last companion, her pet cat Shii-chan. With poor grades, a mean aunt, and few friends who understand her, she feels lonely and desperately believes that God will help her out of these circumstances one day, holding on to the last remaining memento: a ring that originally belonged to her mother. Things change for better for Karin when she meets Himeka Kujyou and her cousin Kazune, whom she lives with. A confrontation after Kazune insults Karin's cat and ultimately her feelings invoke something within her and the ring, causing everything to go smoothly for Karin, including weather matters. It turns out that her precious ring is in fact a holder of the power of God, and Karin, as its bearer, is a goddess. With this revelation, she is hunted down by mysterious enemies who are seeking that power while trying to control her strength. On her journey, she discovers more about her past, and the truth of her goddess heritage, as well as how it affects others around her like Kazune and Himeka.

The adventure continues in Kamichama Karin Chu with the main cast now in the eighth grade. Kazune returns from his trip to England, so Karin and the gang are back together again. Karin and the gang travel through time, along with a new comrade, a celebrity named Jin Kuga.

Characters

Karin is the main protagonist. She used to live with her aunt because her parents died a long time ago, but she moved in with Kazune and Himeka after they found out she can transform into a god. She is an outgoing person and sticks up for her friends, even though she does bad in school. She had a cat named  that died in the beginning of the first series. She is in 7th grade and is 13-years-old. The ring Karin originally thought was her mother's ring allows her to borrow godly power. Her ring is silver and has the power of the goddess Athena, the Greek goddess of wisdom and war (in the "Chu" sequel her new ring has the power of Aphrodite, the Greek goddess of love). It is later revealed in the later volumes of the manga that Karin is actually Kazune Kujyou's wife, Suzuka Kujyou (Suzuka is Karin backwards, since suzu is another way to read the character rin). Karin Hanazono is Suzuka Kujyou from the past and was turned back into a baby by professor Kujyou to protect her. She is also the mother of Himeka and Suzune. It is shown that whenever Kazune becomes drunk (even with so much as the smell of alcohol), he acts perverted towards Karin. They end up together and will end up loving each other (without either of them knowing at first in the beginning of the anime). At the end of Kamichama Karin Chu, it is shown that she and Kazune get married.

Kazune's ring has the power of Apollo, Greek god of the sun (in the Chu sequel, he has a different ring with the power of Uranus, the Greek god of the sky). He is in 7th grade. While he acts cool during much of the story, Himeka states that in the past, he was weak and cried frequently, only becoming his present self when he turned ten years old, after knowing who he was. While Himeka loves bugs, Kazune hates and fears them; in Kamichama Karin, Himeka reveals that Kazune's fear of bugs developed when he and Himeka ran into a giant bug when he was little (which, ironically, was Karin in a bug suit). Even though he is a clone of professor Kazuto Kujyou, he is incomplete and passes out after transforming in god form. He often speaks to Karin in a way that she deems sexist, talking about things like the inherent stupidity or weakness of girls (this is used against him in Chu when Jin calls him a 'girly boy'). He himself is the clone of his "father". The older Kazune, Kazuto, put his research in Himeka, and then split them in half to protect his work from his former partner, Kirihiko Karasuma. Because Karin is Suzuka, he is "married" to Karin and they get married for real at the end of Chu. He is also the father of Himeka and Suzune.

In Chu, his and Karin's son, Suzune comes from the future. He warns them that Kazune goes missing in the future (with a woman Suzune claims), and later it is discovered that he actually died soon after Suzune was born. When he learns of this, he stays away from Karin, believing what he did was horrible and had caused the future Karin too much trouble. Karin punches him after discovering this was the reason why he avoided her, saying she knew he disappeared in the future but was working hard to change that.

Himeka is Karin's friend and Kazune's "cousin". She is the daughter of Kazuto and Suzuka. However, it turns out that she is somewhat Karin and Kazune's daughter, due to that Karin is Suzuka and Kazune is Kazuto's clone. Because of this, she is also Suzune's "older sister". Originally she contained Kazuto's god research data, she was then split into two by Kirihiko attempting to steal the research data. One half lives with Kazune, while the other lives with the Karasumas. When one Himeka becomes stronger, the other becomes weaker. Since she was a young girl, she has always defended Kazune, who was a bit of a crybaby when they were little. She loves bugs and is a good cook. She is in 7th grade. Like Karin, she does poorly in school. She tells Karin at one point that while she has a strong affection for Kazune, it is not necessarily a romantic attachment, as Kazune is "kind of like a brother and kind of like a dad" to Himeka (referencing Kazune's identity as a clone of Himeka's father).She also witnessed Kazune and Karin kissing in the anime. Later in the series, Kazune says that Himeka is his daughter (along with Karin in Kamichama Karin 7), which surprised her.

 President of Sakuragaoka Academy. He tests the protagonists and fights them outside the campus. Karin refers to him as "Mr. Glasses Man" (meganekko), "Four eyes-san" or "Glasses Guy". In the anime, he is a running gag character; often leaving before ever winning and revealing his plot to Karin and the others while they didn't know, thinking they did. His ring has the powers of the god Ares. Later in the series, his ring is destroyed by Kazune. He then gets possessed by his father, Kirihiko, via Zeus ring he wore after his broke, but in the end Karin and Kazune saved him. He then returns in Chu. Now, with the other Himeka, he is trying to create a new Zeus ring using the 'seed of chaos', in order to save the future Kirika who is sick. To do that, he has to revive his father, whom currently resides within Jin Kuga.

Kirika is Kirio's fraternal twin sister, but for most of the series poses as a young man and Kirio's twin brother. With slightly masculine features to go along with her natural feminine beauty, as well as a kind personality, Kirika came across to many as a princely figure, which caused Karin to instantly develop a crush on her. At first, she does not believe that Karin is a goddess, but comes to believe in it. Kirika is unwillingly forced to fight Karin because of the other Himeka and her brother Kirio. Later on the manga in Volumes 4 and 5, it is revealed to the protagonists that she is actually female. Kirika explains that after the deaths of their parents, Kirio was all she had, but when he started becoming interested in the God rings, she felt as if he were slipping away from her. She at some point chopped off her hair and started pretending she was male in an attempt to in a way emotionally follow Kirio in his footsteps and prevent him from straying too far away. When Karin reveals to Kirika that she had had a crush on her, Kirika replies that in her own, strange way, she had a crush on Karin too, stating that she admired Karin for being able to be powerful without having to hide her gender. She gives help to Karin and Kazune when her father revives through her brother, Kirio. In Goddess form, she is Nyx.

Michiru or Micchi is a transferred student from England and at one time lived with Karin, Kazune and Himeka. When he was little, he was involved in an accident that killed his parents and crushed his left eye beyond repair, and almost died. But Kazuto made a replaceable eye for Michiru, and saved his life. Since he was in the hospital for a year, he is a year older than Karin, Kazune, and Himeka. Michiru shares a close bond to Kazune, because he first thought of him as Kazuto, and still respects Kazune. In the manga, Michiru's friend Ami brought a notebook containing information about Himeka for Kazune to read. Michiru is a bit a pervert around Karin, and in the manga, he stole Karin's first kiss. In Chu, his transformation is the sea god Neptune/Poseidon.

Jin Kuga is first introduced in Kamichama Karin Chu. He is first seen as any regular "idol" that's new to the show bizz. Jin has a strong confidence in himself and wishes to regain his father's 'honor', as revealed later on in the series. Around the last volumes, it even shows that Jin is actually the father of Kirio Karasuma, who is Kirihiko Karasuma. Just like how Karin Hanazono is actually Kazune's wife, Suzuka Kujyou. Jin tends to 'glomp' and show a lot of affection for Karin which tends to make him Kazune's 'love rival' for her. Even though Jin normally has his sweet an adorable personality, he can sometimes be a pervert (Koge Donbo herself even puts it on his quick profile in the manga) around Karin. In the Chu series, Jin has the ability to transform into the god of the underworld, Hades.

Suzune is first introduced in Kamichama Karin Chu and appears in two episodes of the anime. He is the son of Karin and Kazune, and is Himeka's "younger brother". He came from the future, sent by the future Karin, to warn Karin and the others of the upcoming battle with the Karasumas and the tragic outcome. He is around five years old when he first appears and wears outfits with rabbit ears on his cap. He has Kazune's hair and facial appearance but has Karin's eyes and personality, and is a cute little boy. Both Karin and Kazune love him and protect him. He is the one who tells Karin of the future, including of Kazune's absence (Suzune thinks Kazune left with another woman, but he actually died soon after Suzune's birth) and gives Karin the Cronos Clock. Like all the characters, Suzune can transform, this one into Cupid. The name Suzune is combined of Suzuka (Karin's past self) and Kazune.

Media

Manga
The Kamichama Karin manga series has been released into a total of seven full volumes. Koge-Donbo admits in volume one at how the point of Karin's "I am God" was to have her say something stupid and how the manga started was as a gag. Kamichama Karin was originally going to be a two chapter one-shot manga, according to Koge-Donbo. Due to its unexpected popularity, she continued the story. The story continues on in a sequel series Kamichama Karin Chu. again with seven volumes in regular special edition volumes released in Japan. The special edition volumes include the same basic content as the regular editions but include additional content making them highly valuable to manga collectors. The special editions feature different cover artwork including a gold foiled logo on a clear plastic dust jacket. Each special volume is accompanied by booklets which contain whole extra chapters to the story (usually the information in these extra chapters is supplementary, and not critical, to the main story).

Anime

An anime of Kamichama Karin debuted in Japan on April 6, 2007. Animation was done by the animation studio Satelight. The story starts off in Kamichama Karin Chu, the sequel to Kamichama Karin. Karin and Suzune are running through a park when Rika attacks Karin. Karin's Chronos Clock (which has the power to time-travel) gets the Seed of Chaos implanted into it and brings her to the first time she met Kazune at Shii-chan's grave. After that, the events follow the storyline of the manga. Kamichama Karin was shown in Japan every Saturday. An original soundtrack has been released.

Songs
Opening theme
 by Ali Project
Ending themes
 by Mai Nakahara
 by Marble
Character Songs
"Hikari no Accord" by Mai Nakahara/Karin Hanazono
"Desire Show" by Tatsuhisa Suzuki/Jin Kuga

References

External links
Kamichama Karin at TV Tokyo 
Kamichama Karin at Tokyopop

2003 manga
2006 manga
2007 anime television series debuts
Kodansha franchises
Magical girl anime and manga
Satelight
Shōjo manga
Tokyopop titles
TV Tokyo original programming